Tram tracks or tram-track signs are medical signs that bear some resemblance to tramway tracks.

Pulmonology
When found in the lungs, tram tracks are radiologic signs that are usually accompanied by pulmonary edema in cases of congestive heart failure and bronchiectasis. Tram tracks are caused by bronchial wall thickening, and can be detected on a lateral chest X-ray.

Nephrology
The term "tram tracks" is also used to describe the basement membrane duplication found on light microscopy that is characteristic of membranoproliferative glomerulonephritis (MPGN) type I. (It is less commonly associated with types II and III.)

Neurology
The term has also been used to describe findings associated with optic nerve sheath meningioma.

Tram track-shaped calcifications in the cerebral cortex indicate Sturge–Weber syndrome. where intracranial gyriform calcification (brain imaging) seen mostly in occipital and posterior parietal/temporal lobe ;this syndrome consists triad of port wine stain,seizure(usually focal but may become generalized),eye manifestation(e.g. glaucoma).

Mammary glands
Tram track appearance in mammography/USG indicates Duct Ectasia.

References

Nephrology
Respiratory diseases
Radiologic signs